Daniel O'Brien (born April 5, 1986 in Shoreview, Minnesota) is an American soccer player who plays as a midfielder for  Minneapolis City SC in the NPSL.

Career

Youth and College
O’Brien attended Mounds View High School in Arden Hills, Minnesota where he was a two time All State soccer player.  O’Brien began his collegiate soccer career in 2004 with Coastal Carolina University. He transferred to the University of Wisconsin–Green Bay in 2006, finishing his college career with them in 2007. In the summer of 2007, he played for the Des Moines Menace of the Premier Development League.

Professional
On May 1, 2008, he signed with the Minnesota Thunder of the USL First Division. After the fall of the Minnesota Thunder side due to financial problems O'Brien in January 2010 took the chance to move to New Zealand and join Western Suburbs FC working with Dutch coach John Kila. After a season of hard work with Western Suburbs FC he joined Hawke's Bay United before departing the club after a short stint and signing with the Tampa Bay Rowdies on March 30, 2012. On November 20, 2012 the Rowdies declined the 2013 option.

References

External links
 Minnesota Thunder bio
 UW–Green Bay profile
 Rowdies sign Midfielder Dan O'Brien

1986 births
Living people
People from Shoreview, Minnesota
Soccer players from Minnesota
American soccer players
USL First Division players
USL League Two players
North American Soccer League players
Des Moines Menace players
Minnesota Thunder players
Hawke's Bay United FC players
Tampa Bay Rowdies players
Association football midfielders